"Cherry Bomb" is the debut single by the all-female band the Runaways from their self-titled debut album.  "Cherry Bomb" was ranked 52nd on VH1's 100 Greatest Hard Rock Songs and peaked at number 6 on the Billboard Bubbling Under Hot 100 chart. The song is featured in the films Guardians of the Galaxy and Wreck-It Ralph.

About the song
Rhythm guitarist/back-vocalist Joan Jett composed the song with Kim Fowley, the band's then-manager. In the 2005 documentary Edgeplay: A Film About the Runaways, Fowley and former Runaways lead singer Cherie Currie claimed that "Cherry Bomb" was quickly written just for Currie to audition for the band because the band members could not perform the song she originally chose to sing.

The song was included in the soundtrack for the 2014 film Guardians of the Galaxy, in the second episode of the 2019 Amazon Prime series The Boys, and in the 2021 Netflix film Fear Street Part Two: 1978.

Jett re-recorded the song with her band the Blackhearts for the 1984 album Glorious Results of a Misspent Youth. Cherie Currie also re-recorded "Cherry Bomb" with Marie Currie, her twin sister, on their 1997 re-released version of the album Messin' with the Boys.

Personnel
Cherie Currie - lead vocals
Lita Ford - lead guitar
Joan Jett - rhythm guitar, backing vocals
Sandy West - drums, backing vocals

Additional musicians
Nigel Harrison - bass-guitar

Charts

Certifications

References

1976 debut singles
1976 songs
Mercury Records singles
The Runaways songs
Songs written by Joan Jett
Songs written by Kim Fowley